Dew Barn is a historic tobacco barn for curing leaves located near Zion, Marion County, South Carolina. It was built before 1935, and is a hewn-timber tobacco barn with a steep, metal-covered gable roof, surrounded on all sides by a metal-roofed shed.  The barn has an arched brick firebox, which supplied the heat for curing.

It was listed in the National Register of Historic Places in 1984.

References

Barns on the National Register of Historic Places in South Carolina
Buildings and structures in Marion County, South Carolina
National Register of Historic Places in Marion County, South Carolina
Barns in South Carolina
Tobacco barns
Tobacco buildings in the United States